The men's freestyle 61 kilograms wrestling competition at the 2014 Asian Games in Incheon was held on 29 September 2014 at the Dowon Gymnasium.

Schedule
All times are Korea Standard Time (UTC+09:00)

Results 
Legend
F — Won by fall

Main bracket

Repechage

Final standing

References

Wrestling Database

External links
Official website

Wrestling at the 2014 Asian Games